Ski flying is a winter sport discipline derived from ski jumping, in which much greater distances can be achieved. It is a form of competitive individual Nordic skiing where athletes descend at high speed along a specially designed takeoff ramp using skis only; jump from the end of it with as much power as they can generate; then glide – or 'fly' – as far as possible down a steeply sloped hill; and ultimately land within a target zone in a stable manner. Points are awarded for distance and stylistic merit by five judges. Events are governed by the International Ski Federation (Fédération Internationale de Ski; FIS).

The rules and scoring in ski flying are mostly the same as they are in ski jumping, and events under the discipline are usually contested as part of the FIS Ski Jumping World Cup season, but the hills (of which there are only five remaining, all in Europe) are constructed to different specifications in order to enable jumps of up to 66% longer in distance. There is also a stronger emphasis on aerodynamics and harnessing the wind, as well as an increased element of danger due to athletes flying much higher and faster than in ski jumping.

From its beginnings in the 1930s, ski flying has developed its own distinct history and since given rise to all of the sport's world records. The first hill designed specifically for ski flying was built in Yugoslavia in 1934, after which both Germany and Austria built their own hills in 1950. This was followed by Norway in 1966, the United States in 1970, and Czechoslovakia in 1980. From the 1960s to 1980s, a friendly rivalry between the European venues saw world records being set regularly, together with hill upgrades and evolutions in technique to fly longer distances.

Ski flying remains at its most popular in Norway and Slovenia, where the most recent world records over the past three decades have been set in front of audiences numbering 30,000–60,000. It has been called the Super Bowl of winter sports.

History

1930s–1940s

Breaking the 100 metre barrier and the birth of ski flying

A year earlier, Olav Ulland had crossed the 100 m barrier in Ponte di Legno, Italy, but touched the snow with his hands, which rendered his jump – and world record – unofficial.

With jumps now in the triple digits, Bloudek enthused: "That was no longer ski jumping. That was ski flying!" It was with these words that ski flying took on a life of its own. Such was the awe and disbelief at these massive jumps, the units of measurement were trivialised by the media, who suggested that the metre used in Yugoslavia was shorter than elsewhere in Europe.

Bradl later spoke fondly of the jump which made him an icon in the sport:

The air pushed violently against my chest; I leaned right into it and let it carry me. I had only one wish: to fly as far as possible! ... [After landing the jump], many thousands of curious eyes looked up at the judges' tower. I could hardly believe it when an additional '1' popped up on the scoreboard!

Dispute between the FIS and Planica

Bloudek and his team nonetheless went ahead and flouted the rules in creating a so-called "mammoth hill" specifically designed for previously unimaginable distances.

After a period of wrangling and increasing public interest in the novelty of this new 'extreme' form of ski jumping, the FIS relented. In 1938, a decision was made at the fifteenth International Ski Congress in Helsinki, Finland, to allow for "experimental" hill design, thereby officially recognising ski flying as a sanctioned discipline. Despite this reluctant recognition, the FIS still frowned upon the practice of aiming predominantly for long distances over style, and presently refuses to publish lists of world records in an official capacity. Furthermore, the rules for ski flying would not be fully established until after World War II.

After World War II had passed, Fritz Tschannen matched the K-point with a jump of 120 m in 1948. This marked the last time Planica would hold the world record for almost two decades, as emerging new hills would soon provide stern competition.

1950s–1960s

New hills across Europe

A challenger to Planica arrived in 1949 with the construction of Heini-Klopfer-Skiflugschanze ("Heini Klopfer ski flying hill") in Oberstdorf, West Germany. Designed by former ski jumper turned architect Heini Klopfer, as well as then-active ski jumpers Toni Brutscher and Sepp Weiler, the hill had a K-point of 120 m to match that of Bloudkova velikanka. The FIS, still wary of the rising popularity of ski flying and wanting to keep it in check, refused to sanction the construction of the hill, having previously denounced the 1947 and 1948 events in Planica.

The stance of the FIS eased once again, as the inaugural event in Oberstdorf was given approval to be staged in 1950. Tauno Luiro eclipsed it the following year by jumping , a world record which would stay in place for almost ten years until Jože Šlibar jumped  in 1961. The past two decades of Planica holding a near-monopoly over the world record now seemed a distant memory, as it would instead be Oberstdorf's turn to do the same.

Also in 1950, a ski flying hill was built at Kulm in Tauplitz/Bad Mitterndorf, Austria. Another hill entered the scene in 1966, when Vikersundbakken ("Vikersund hill") in Vikersund, Norway was rebuilt to ski flying specifications, having originally opened as a ski jumping hill in 1936. Although hills in Norway were still at the forefront of ski jumping, their prominence in ski flying was short-lived, as it would be the last time Vikersund would hold a world record until four decades later.

Seeking to co-operate on hill design and event organisation, the venues at Kulm, Oberstdorf and Planica formed the KOP working group in 1962 (KOP being an abbreviation of Kulm/Oberstdorf/Planica). This group would go on to consult with the FIS in all aspects of ski flying, celebrating their 50th anniversary in 2012. In 1953, Kulm hosted the first International Ski Flying Week, which would be the premier event in ski flying until 1972.

Breaking the 150 metre barrier

In 1967, in Oberstdorf, Lars Grini became the first to reach . Planica triumphantly reclaimed its world record in 1969 with a new hill named Velikanka bratov Gorišek ("Giant by brothers Gorišek"). This was the brainchild of Slovenian brothers Janez and Vlado Gorišek, both engineers, who opted to design a new hill with a K-point of  instead of enlarging the adjacent Bloudkova velikanka, which was showing signs of deterioration. Today, Janez is affectionately called the "father" of modern ski flying and a revered figure in Slovenia. Bloudkova velikanka was subsequently recategorised as a ski jumping hill.

It can be said that competition between hill locations, all vying for world record honours, truly began at this time. The 1960s remains the decade with the highest amount of world records since the advent of ski flying, with seventeen in total being set on the hills in Oberstdorf, Planica, Kulm and Vikersund. By contrast the 1950s had the fewest with four, all being set in Oberstdorf.

1970s

Planica versus Oberstdorf

The world record stayed in Planica for four years, during which the K-point at Velikanka bratov Gorišek was upgraded to 165 m in time for the inaugural Ski Flying World Championships in 1972, which eventually superseded International Ski Flying Week. This new event was sanctioned a year earlier by the FIS at their 28th International Ski Congress in Opatija, Croatia (then a part of Yugoslavia). Much like in 1938 when the discipline received official recognition from the FIS, another milestone had been reached as ski flying was now granted its own world championship-level event on par with the Ski Jumping World Championships, having spent almost four decades as a mere 'special attraction' alongside its older and more prestigious sibling.

Janez Gorišek was brought in to oversee the project following Heini Klopfer's death in 1968. Determined to claim the world record for himself, Walter Steiner – the reigning Ski Flying World Champion – jumped  and  but crashed heavily on both attempts, sustaining a concussion and a fractured rib. He would finish the event with a silver medal, behind winner Hans-Georg Aschenbach.

A year later in Planica, in front of a 50,000-strong crowd, Steiner finally achieved the world record he had been striving for, landing a jump of 169 m to equal that of Wossipiwo in 1973. Spectators were astonished and the event organisers momentarily bewildered, as Steiner had landed well beyond the markers used to indicate distance alongside the hill, which only went as far as the existing K-point of 165 m. For the first time since their respective hills had been built, the competition was levelled between Oberstdorf and Planica. On the next day of the event in the latter, Steiner tried to go even further: he landed at  but fell down on what was almost flat ground, although this time he managed to walk away (albeit on unsteady legs) with only cuts to his face.

Safety issues arise

All these increasingly long distances came at a price, as illustrated by filmmaker Werner Herzog in his 1974 documentary The Great Ecstasy of Woodcarver Steiner. During both the aforementioned events in Oberstdorf and Planica, several athletes including Steiner had far exceeded the limits of the hill by 'out-jumping' it or 'running out of slope'. Jumps were much further than in the 1950s, during which the old Kongsberger technique was still in use. The results were now potentially fatal each time: athletes were landing only metres away from completely flat ground, or the equivalent of falling from a multi-storey building with forward momentum. Furthermore, only a wool cap and goggles – or no headgear at all – were worn; an antiquated feature left unchanged from the very earliest days of ski jumping more than 150 years prior. In 1979, at their 32nd International Ski Congress in Nice, France, the FIS mandated helmets to be worn by athletes at all ski jumping and flying events.

In Herzog's documentary, Steiner is shown to reflect with trepidation in Oberstdorf:

Ski flying has reached the point where it's beginning to present real dangers. We've just about reached the limit, I believe, as far as speed is concerned. ... Maybe I'd prefer to turn back [and] go back to flying off 150- or 130-metre hills, but it's the thrill of flying so far that nevertheless gives me a kick.

Further down the hill and pointing to a wooden marker indicating Steiner's failed efforts, Herzog explains solemnly:

This mark is, in fact, the point where ski flying starts to be inhuman. Walter Steiner was in very great danger. If he'd flown  more, he'd have landed down here on the flat. Just imagine, it's like falling from a height of  onto a flat surface: to a certain death.

In Planica, Herzog quoted Steiner as having said that he felt like he was in an arena with 50,000 people waiting to see him crash. On the third day of the event, while talking to journalists after a jump, Steiner appeared angered at the organisers' pressure on him to set more world records at the expense of his well-being: "They let me jump too far four times. That shouldn't happen. It's scandalous of those Yugoslav judges up there who are responsible."

The stalemate between the venues did not last long, as four world records were set in Oberstdorf within a span of four days in 1976, bringing the official figure up to  set by Toni Innauer at the end of the event. Three years later, Planica drew level once again when Klaus Ostwald equalled the world record. Elsewhere, in the Western Hemisphere, the United States opened its own ski flying venue in 1970: Copper Peak in Ironwood, Michigan, had a K-point of 145 m, therefore not designed for world record distances from the outset. It remains the only ski flying hill to have been built outside of Europe.

1980s

Harrachov joins in, Planica versus Oberstdorf continues

Planica and Oberstdorf briefly had a new challenger when the Čerťák K165 hill in Harrachov, Czech Republic (then a part of Czechoslovakia), was opened in 1980. For one year, all three venues shared the world record when Armin Kogler jumped 176 m at Harrachov's opening event. Notably, at the 1980 Harrachov event, 16-year-old rookie Steve Collins won all three competitions with jumps consistently close to world record figures. At the 1983 Ski Flying World Championships, Pavel Ploc brought the world record back to Harrachov (which had since been upgraded to K185) by jumping ; this remains the last time a world record was set there.

The issue of safety in ski flying had resurfaced. In only a single day at the aforementioned 1983 event, the hill in Harrachov – a location named "Devil's Mountain" – became notorious for causing many violent accidents. Horst Bulau crashed and suffered a concussion, while Steinar Bråten and Jens Weißflog also crashed. Tapio Mikkonen crashed heavily in 1980, as did Ploc in 1985 and Iztok Melin in 1989. All escaped serious injury, but it was a chilling precursor of more to come.

Over the next few years, the one-upmanship continued as the world record was again traded between Planica and Oberstdorf. In 1984, Matti Nykänen jumped  twice on the same day in Oberstdorf. By improving this to  the next day, Nykänen became the first athlete since Reidar Andersen in 1935 to set three world records in the space of 24 hours. It would be the end of an era as this was the last time a world record was set in Oberstdorf; altogether twenty were set there.

In 1985, to coincide with that year's Ski Flying World Championships, Planica underwent another upgrade to increase the K-point to 185 m. World records were again shattered as a result. Mike Holland first jumped  to become the first American world record holder since Henry Hall in 1921. Nykänen would follow this up by landing a metre further.

Mike Holland later described his own jump:

The world record jump was very smooth. It felt like I was lying on my stomach on a glass coffee table, watching a movie projected on a screen underneath the table. Although the flight was very smooth, it seemed like the movie projector was running the film faster than intended.

Safety issues reach their peak

The 1986 Ski Flying World Championships in Kulm highlighted the dangers of the sport in a most graphic way. In the second competition of the event, Andreas Felder equalled the world record to win the gold medal, ahead of Nykänen who won bronze. All of this was overshadowed by a series of horrific accidents which took place earlier. In treacherous crosswind conditions, Masahiro Akimoto lost control moments after takeoff, falling suddenly from a height of  onto his back. He suffered a fractured ankle in addition to chest and shoulder injuries.

Immediately afterwards, Ulf Findeisen fell out of the air on his jump, crashing down face-first from 9 m and flipping head over heels repeatedly along the slope, only coming to a stop several seconds later. Al Trautwig, commentating for American TV network ABC, likened Findeisen to "a ragdoll" after the fall. Former ski jumper Jeff Hastings, co-commentating, said: "I'm feeling a little sick to my stomach, Al... I can't believe this. I've never seen ski flying like this... So many falls." Findeisen was barely conscious and had to be stretchered away, later going into cardiac arrest but surviving.

In the next round of the competition, Berg attempted another jump but was not as fortunate this time: he fell out of the air, just as before, and crashed almost identically to Findeisen. One of Berg's skis, which had come loose after impact and was still attached to his foot, flailed around and hit him in the face – exposed due to his goggles detaching – as he was sliding to a stop. His injuries, including concussion and a broken ACL, were career-ending. At this point, Trautwig began calling into question the nature of the sport: "Jeff, we talk about the fear and why the ski flyers are scared... I'm really starting to ask, why we're here and why they're doing it." Ernst Vettori, who was awaiting his own jump, withdrew from the event after witnessing the falls.

With height over the hills (athletes were reaching  in Planica) and takeoff speeds (Pavel Ploc reached  in Harrachov in 1983) at an all-time high, as well as distances approaching , the FIS took a stance against record-hunting for safety reasons. From Felder's world record in 1986 onwards, the FIS implemented a rule in which distance points would not be awarded beyond 191 m; the jump would still count, but no points further than that could be achieved. Per this rule, Fijas' jump was officially scaled down to 191 m by the FIS, but the KOP group (led by the organisers in Kulm, Oberstdorf and Planica) independently recorded the actual figure. Neither Kulm nor Planica would hold a ski flying event for several years, leaving Oberstdorf and Vikersund to host the Ski Flying World Championships in 1988 and 1990, respectively. At those events, world record distances and major incidents were avoided.

1990s

New safety measures

The dangers of ski flying were still on full display at the 1992 Ski Flying World Championships in Harrachov, where Andreas Goldberger suffered a similar crash to the ones which occurred in Kulm in 1986. He was taken by helicopter to a hospital, having sustained a broken arm and collarbone, and a concussion. František Jež also crashed, but was able to walk away with some help.

The second and final day of the event was stopped due to worsened weather, culminating in a high-speed fall by Christof Duffner just as he landed a world record-equalling jump of 194 m, albeit rendered invalid because of the fall. With the event cancelled, Goldberger's efforts from earlier were enough to earn him a silver medal behind eventual winner Noriaki Kasai, who became the first non-European Ski Flying World Champion. Goldberger was able to return to top-level competition within less than a year.

Protective wind nets by the side of the hill were later installed in Harrachov for 1996 to minimise the effects of crosswind, along with major reprofiling of the slope to comply with FIS safety regulations. Thanks to these modifications, athletes no longer jumped with as much height as before and no major accidents have occurred in Harrachov since 1992.

Speaking about his experience at the 1983 Ski Flying World Championships in Harrachov, Mike Holland said:

Climbing over the knoll, I thought 'this is SO damned high, I shouldn't be this high.' Since I wasn't ready for such height and speed, I threw out my arms at the end of the flight and let myself down  short of the world record.

Technique changes: parallel to V-style

It was during this time that the entire sport of ski jumping underwent a significant transition in technique. Until the early 1990s nearly all athletes used the parallel style (or Däscher technique), in which the skis are held close together and parallel to each other. This had been the norm since the 1950s; Matti Nykänen created a variation in the 1980s with the skis pointed diagonally to the side in a crude attempt to increase surface area, yielding more distance. However, this came largely at the expense of stability and balance, akin to 'walking a tightrope' in mid-air and leaving athletes at the mercy of the elements. Akimoto, Findeisen, Berg and Goldberger's accidents were all caused by unpredictable gusts of wind that made them lose control at the highest and fastest stage of their jumps, exacerbated by an outdated technique ill-suited to the new extremes of ski flying, as well as the prevalence of older hills featuring very steep slopes.

In the late 1980s and early 1990s, Jan Boklöv pioneered the V-style: skis were instead spread outwards in an aerodynamic "V" shape, with the athlete's body lying much flatter between them. This created yet more surface area and lift, instantly enabling distances of up to ten per cent further. It also had a favourable effect of granting more stability in the air, although the peak speed was some  slower than the parallel style. At first this new technique was looked upon unfavourably by the judges, who made it an issue to downgrade style points for those who used it. Nevertheless, within a few years, with Boklöv having won the 1988/89 Ski Jumping World Cup season and other athletes promptly adopting the technique, the judges' stance quietly eased and the V-style became the ubiquitous standard still used today.

The V-style itself had a transitional period of its own, going from a narrower "V" in the early to mid-1990s – which retained some features of the parallel style – to a much wider one at the end of the decade. Some athletes preferred to cross the back of the skis to exaggerate the "V" angle, while others leaned even more forward so that their body lay almost flat between the skis; both variations remain in use. The V-style is still not immune to failure if the air pressure under one ski is lost, but the results are much less catastrophic than with the parallel style; the latter had resulted in more head-first landings, whereas the V-style sees somewhat 'safer' landings on the back or shoulders. According to Mike Holland, "If you were hit by a gust of wind in the air, you would just flip over mid-flight", in reference to the parallel style.

Breaking the 200 metre barrier

In 1994, ski flying returned to a newly independent Slovenia, where the hill in Planica had been reprofiled with the aim of allowing for jumps of more than 200 m. The FIS was strongly against this and initially threatened to cancel the event on the grounds that its regulations on hill design had been violated. Negotiations between the organisers in Planica and the FIS managed to defuse the situation, allowing that year's Ski Flying World Championships to take place.

With most athletes having switched to the V-style, the sport was about to reach one of its biggest ever milestones. During the training round on the opening day of the event, Martin Höllwarth jumped  to edge the world record ever closer to 200 m. This was the first time a world record had been set using the V-style, with Piotr Fijas' being the last to use the parallel style. Andreas Goldberger became the first ski jumper in history to cross the 200 m barrier when he landed at  but failed to maintain his balance as he squatted down and touched the snow with his hands, rendering his jump an unofficial world record.

On the next day during the second training round, Christof Duffner almost had his moment of glory when he jumped , but fell upon landing just as he had done two years earlier in Harrachov. The restrictive rule concerning jumps beyond 191 m, in place since 1986, was subsequently abolished by the FIS. However, as the rule was still in place at the time of Nieminen and Bredesen's jumps, their additional distances were nullified. This handed Jaroslav Sakala (with a jump of 185 m) the Ski Flying World Championship at the end of the event, which was shortened to only a single competition round due to strong winds forcing cancellation of the other. Jinya Nishikata and Johan Rasmussen each suffered heavy crashes due to these winds.

In 2014, Nieminen spoke about the jump that cemented his name in the history books:

It was the kind of jump in which, even when arriving [at the bottom of the hill] in the landing position and not knowing at all what lies ahead, I remember that my legs were trembling. That's how terrified I was. ... Overcoming your own fears is the best feeling. The nature of the sport is that one has to challenge themselves. That's why this jump has remained a highlight of my career.

Planica dominates

Beginning with Fijas's world record in 1987, Planica enjoyed a very long period of exclusivity. Much like in the 1930s and 1940s, no other hills would come close to reclaiming the accolade for 24 years, despite nearly all receiving K-point upgrades to 185 m. Only Copper Peak remained unchanged at K145, staging its last event to date in 1994 with a hill record of  shared between Werner Schuster and Mathias Wallner. Since then, the hill has served as a popular tourist attraction in which sightseers are able to access the top of the inrun via an elevator. In 2013, following almost two decades of disuse as a sporting venue, it was announced that the hill at Copper Peak would be renovated as the world's largest ski jumping hill, additionally capable of staging summer events.

With eight years between Fijas and Höllwarth's world records, it was the longest drought of unbroken records since that of Tauno Luiro from 1951 was broken by Jože Šlibar in 1961. In Planica the hill was reprofiled again in 1997, and the world record was broken a further four times in the remainder of the decade, culminating with Tommy Ingebrigtsen jumping  in 1999 to send ski flying into the new millennium.

2000s
The latter stood for three years until being equalled by Adam Małysz in 2003, but his achievement was only temporary. When interviewed after the event, Hautamäki said that "The longer one stays in the air, the more fun it is."

Despite improvements in safety since the 1990s, Planica still saw several violent accidents occur in consecutive years: Valery Kobelev (1999), Takanobu Okabe (2000), Robert Kranjec (2001) and Tomasz Pochwała (2002) all crashed at the top of the knoll due to sudden losses of ski pressure.

Before the 2004 Ski Flying World Championships, the hill was renamed to Letalnica bratov Gorišek ("Flying hill by brothers Gorišek"). In 2005, the venue continued its dominance of ski flying when the world record was shattered four times on the same day. Commentating for Finnish broadcaster MTV3, former world record holder Toni Nieminen remarked forebodingly after Romøren's jump that "the landing area is now practically completely flat ground."

MTV3 commentator Jani Uotila called it "A horrendous jump! This is all getting too dangerous now!", while co-commentator Nieminen explained that "When one comes down on flat ground, the impact is really hard." Ahonen was momentarily knocked out, but sustained no injuries. He was stretchered away and able to wave to the crowd, and returned later in the event to step onto the podium for winning his second consecutive World Cup title.

In 2013, Ahonen revealed that the consequences of not reining in the jump prematurely in the way he did would have likely resulted in broken legs, or worse:

In the initial flight phase I thought, 'Oh damn, now we're going far.' Half way down the slope I got a warm feeling that, 'Yes, now it's a world record. This is certain to be a new world record.' Then as I flew further I realised, 'Oh no, this is not going to end well. This is really not going to end well. I'm going to break my legs at the least.' ... Experts have calculated that had I not brought down my jump, it would've flown at least .

2010s

Major hill upgrades begin, Vikersund re-emerges

In the aftermath of the Planica event and following numerous near-flat ground landings, it became clear that ski flying had once again outgrown an older hill and needed enlarging in the years to come. In 2005, almost immediately after the conclusion of the World Cup season, talks were under way to upgrade the hill in Vikersund. This became a reality in mid-2010, when the FIS announced major rule changes at the 47th International Ski Congress in Antalya, Turkey, to allow for ski flying hills to be constructed to their largest sizes yet.

Janez Gorišek, known for his expertise in ski flying hill design, was the leader of this project. Anticipating a renewed world record rivalry, organisers in Vikersund welcomed the healthy competition with Planica. This served as a preparation event for the 2012 Ski Flying World Championships, which went on to draw a crowd of 60,000.

Breaking the 250 metre barrier
Another K-point modification in Vikersund (this time to 200 m) resulted in the coveted 250 m barrier being reached in 2015, with Peter Prevc landing a clean jump right on the mark to claim another historic milestone in the sport.

Further hill upgrades
Between 2015 and 2017, upgrades from K185 to K200 were also completed in Kulm, Planica, and Oberstdorf. In 2018, the hill sizes on all active flying hills were upgraded to 235–240 m, making them fully equipped for jumps exceeding those distances (previous hill records were broken at each opening event), as well as having improved facilities for athletes and spectators. Harrachov remains the only hill, at K185, to have not been upgraded in any major way since the 1990s. Although the new hills are much larger than ever before, they generally feature longer and less steeply angled slopes, designed purely for the V-style and with the knowledge of 80 years' worth of world record progression.

Inrun tables have also been placed further back from the knoll and flight curves made shallower in order to allow athletes to glide more efficiently and safely along the contour of the slope. This has significantly reduced such precarious heights over the knoll as was the case in the early 1990s and prior: in that era, athletes using the parallel style would jump in a more upward trajectory off the table, reaching vast heights but at the expense of distance; and rather than glide, they instead plummeted towards the slope. Today, Kulm and Planica remain extremely steep in the flight phase; Oberstdorf and Vikersund, by comparison, have longer slopes and do not enable as much height over the knoll.

At the end of the 2015 World Cup season, following Prevc and Fannemel's world records, then-FIS race director Walter Hofer stated that the limit had been reached on the newest hills, and that no further expansion to their size was expected in the near future. He also noted in 2011 that the FIS rules on hill sizes would likely remain unchanged for another decade. Despite this, Janez Gorišek has made plans for a  hill in Planica, albeit put on hold until the FIS rules are again changed. Fannemel said in 2015 that he believed  was the limit in Vikersund, but that the world record could be broken again in Planica.

Beyond 250 metres

In 2016, rookie athlete Tilen Bartol came close to setting a new world record during a trial round in Planica, but crashed in a very dangerous way onto near-flat ground at 252 m and almost broke his neck. The Vikersund event was staged as the finale of the inaugural Raw Air tournament, which was won by Kraft. The event also saw an unprecedented number of jumps surpassing 230 m and 240 m, new national records, and new personal best distances by exceptionally many athletes.

Kraft said of his world record:

I knew the ramp in Vikersund can jump pretty darn far. It was an incredible flight and it was important that I was able to do it. During the flight, I thought "it's now or never".

Although his achievement initially came under scrutiny, as it appeared that he touched the snow with his backside as he was forced to squat down on essentially flat ground, slow-motion replay analysis confirmed that his landing was valid with only millimetres to spare. A week later, Planica caught up to Vikersund with a plethora of more personal bests, and three athletes – including Kraft, twice – landing jumps of, or beyond, 250 m. Kamil Stoch would set a hill record of 251.5 m, with the season finale competition drawing an attendance of 16,500. In 2018, in Planica, Gregor Schlierenzauer equalled the world record of 253.5 m but touched the snow with his hands upon landing.

Differences from ski jumping
Unlike ski jumping, which can be contested in the summer on specially equipped hills with plastic surfaces, ski flying is strictly a winter sport and not part of the Winter Olympics; no world records have therefore been set in the history of the Olympics. Also in contrast to ski jumping, athletes are not able to practice on ski flying hills out of season, as they are sanctioned only for competition events. Among the Alpine countries there was an unwritten gentlemen's agreement forbidding athletes under the age of 18 to participate in ski flying events, but an exception was made for 17-year-old Domen Prevc in 2017.

Rather than being considered a separate sport on its own, ski flying is essentially an offshoot of ski jumping involving larger hills and longer jump distances. Former US national ski jumping coach Larry Stone has said, "It's the same thing, just bigger. You're going faster and flying higher... Basically, it's just a real big jump." The competitive standard for distance in ski flying is in the range of 230–240 m, with 254 m being the absolute longest distance reached to date, at Vikersundbakken in Norway.

Hills

The main difference between ski flying and ski jumping pertains to hill design, as mandated by the FIS. Historically, hills with a K-point (German: Konstruktionspunkt) – or target landing zone – of more than 145 m were classed as ski flying hills. As jump distances increased by the decade, so did a small number of unique hills at locations seeking to outdo each other in a friendly rivalry for world record honours. Since 1980, there have only been five of these hills in Europe and one in the US.

In the landing zone, the angle of the hill is between 33.2–35 degrees.

Seven ski flying hills in total were constructed between 1934 and 1980, with subsequent renovations being made in the decades since. Six are currently in use, but only five of them as flying hills. The joint largest hills in the world are Vikersundbakken in Norway and Letalnica bratov Gorišek in Slovenia. The joint second largest are Kulm in Austria and Heini-Klopfer-Skiflugschanze in Germany. The smallest is Čerťák in the Czech Republic. Vikersundbakken and Letalnica are differently designed, with Letalnica enabling much higher and faster jumps, with consequently a harder landing.

Proposals

There have been a number of proposed ski flying hills, most of which never reached the construction stage. Two were announced in 2007 in Finland, in Kemijärvi and Ylitornio, but neither project was realized. In Norway, prior to the renovation of Vikersund, there were serious talks about constructing a new ski flying hill at Rødkleiva in Oslo. The most recent proposal has come from China, together with German architects Graft, who are in the development stages of a ski jumping and flying hill complex at the Wangtiane ski resort in the Changbai Mountains.

In the US, Copper Peak, the only ski flying hill built outside of Europe, plans to reopen in October 2024. It would remain the smallest of the active hills, but the only one equipped for summer events and out-of-competition training.

Events

The most prestigious event in ski flying is the World Championships, which was first held in Planica in 1972 and has been staged biennially since 1988, in a rotating schedule at all hills except Copper Peak. The World Championships replaced various incarnations of International Ski Flying Week, which ran from 1953 to 1989. Gold, silver and bronze medals are awarded after two competitions, with the total points winner receiving the title of Ski Flying World Champion. A team competition was introduced in 2004, in which medals are also awarded.

Ski flying events outside of the World Championships are a regular feature on the Ski Jumping World Cup calendar, usually occurring on two or three hills; unusually, the 2018 season staged events on four hills (one as part of the World Championships, three in the World Cup). Even more unusually, during the 2021 season, Planica hosted the World Championships near the start of the season, and the World Cup to conclude the season.

Because athletes almost always participate in both disciplines, points scored in ski flying also count towards the Ski Jumping World Cup standings. From 1991 to 2001, and from 2009 onwards, an additional title and trophy for the Ski Flying World Cup has been awarded at the end of each season to the overall points winner of solely ski flying competitions, even if only one took place.

Rules and technique
All these figures are considerably less in ski jumping. David Goldstrom, longtime commentator for Eurosport, has likened the appearance of ski flying to that of "flying like a bird".

Event organisation
The FIS race director, assistant race director, and jury (the latter consisting of the chief of competition, technical delegate, and assistant technical delegate) are a core team of personnel in charge of an entire event. Sandro Pertile has been the FIS chief race director of ski flying and ski jumping events since 2020. Borek Sedlák, himself a former ski jumper, has been the assistant race director and second-in-command since 2017. However, neither Pertile nor Sedlák are involved in the jury's decision-making with regards to gate changes; they may consult with the jury, but the latter's decision is final. The jury is served by different representatives for each competition.

Spectators at the venue watching from large screen displays, as well as viewers watching on TV, are able to see instant replays and on-screen graphics provided by the FIS, which display a multitude of detailed information.

Inrun

A ski jump or ski flight begins from the inrun, a ramp structure at the top of the hill in the form of a tower, or set naturally against the hill formation. Access to this area is via ski lift or on foot. Since the late 1980s, when the V-style began enabling jumps dangerously close to flat ground, the full length of a ski flying inrun has never been used due to safety reasons. Contrary to popular misconception, the table is declined downwards instead of upwards, with the angle of decline set between 10.5 and 11.25 degrees.

Pre-takeoff phase
Near the top of the inrun, an athlete sits on a start gate – a metal or wooden beam – and awaits their signal to jump via a set of traffic lights (green, amber, and red). These lights are operated directly by the assistant race director. An athlete may enter the gate when amber is shown.  The assistant race director may choose to wait on amber for a maximum of sixty seconds, after which either green or red must be shown. If red is shown after an athlete has entered the gate, the jury will have deemed the wind conditions to be unfavourable for a safe jump. The athlete must then carefully exit the gate as they had entered it and await another opportunity to jump. Failure to dismount the gate within five seconds of being shown a red light, or jumping without having been given the signal to go, will disqualify the athlete.

Wind speed is measured in metres per second (m/s) in the form of head-, tail- and crosswind components. In ski flying there are ten separate wind sectors that are measured along the hill, with five in a staggered arrangement on each side; in ski jumping there are seven or less sectors. A hard limit, or corridor of tolerance, of 2 m/s (6.5 ft/s) is permitted in any one sector at a time: if the limit is exceeded, all pending jumps are halted until winds settle to an acceptable level. Weather conditions must be optimal in order to jump competitively and safely, therefore they are actively monitored by the jury, who continuously collaborate with the race directors in making decisions on how an event will progress. The resulting delays may last anywhere from under a minute, to many tens of minutes depending on how variable the conditions are. Athletes are not made aware of the conditions, whilst coaches are able to view them in real-time on a monitor.

Based on the jury's decision, the gate position – of which there are several available numbers – is subject to being adjusted accordingly, including between each jump. In especially tricky conditions, athletes may sometimes be forced to exit and re-enter the gate multiple times before they are cleared to jump. The practice of gates being adjusted too often has become highly unpopular for athletes and audiences since the introduction of mid-round gate adjustments in 2010 (see #Wind and gate compensation).

If conditions are normal and a green light is shown, the athlete's coach – who is situated in a coaches' section lower down the inrun with a flag in hand – gives them the final signal to go; coaches may sometimes have to whistle or give a shouted confirmation in low-visibility conditions. Once given this signal, the athlete must commit to their jump within ten seconds or else risk disqualification, and are no longer permitted to exit the gate. To begin descending the inrun, they drop down from the gate to a crouching position. Speed is rapidly picked up within seconds via built-in tracks, made from porcelain or ceramic, into which the skis are slotted. The athlete's streamlined crouch minimises air resistance along the inrun, and a further effort is made to reduce friction by not allowing the skis to bump too much against the sides of the tracks, as well as wax being applied beforehand. Inrun speed is measured from the table using a radar gun.

No ski poles are used, and no assistance from others (such as being pushed from the gate) is allowed. In heavy snow conditions the tracks can become clogged up, which reduces inrun speed and may cause an unpredictable descent for athletes. At least 22 event personnel standing by the sides of the inrun are assigned to use leaf blowers to prevent the tracks from clogging up with snow.

Takeoff and transition phase

Moments before being launched off the table, the athlete undergoes a sudden increase in g-force due to the curvature – or 'compression' – of the bottom of the inrun. They then initiate a very powerful, explosive jump that requires great leg strength. At this instant the skis are opened up into a horizontal "V" shape, legs straightened and spread apart, and arms held backwards as the athlete adopts their own unique flying position and enters the transition. This highly aerodynamic "V" essentially turns the athlete into a 'flying wing', and all of this takes place in only a tenth of a second before the transition is then "closed" and the flying position maintained until the end of the jump.

Timing is crucial and there is next to no margin for error at this phase. A jump that begins too early or late off the table can mean the difference between an excellent, average or poor effort. Each athlete has their own method of generating as much inrun speed as possible, depending on such intricacies as crouch depth, hip and knee angle, arm placement, or how far the torso is positioned over the knees. Body weight is also a significant factor (see power-to-weight ratio), which has led to some athletes' health becoming a concern over the past two decades.

Takeoff is the most dangerous stage of a jump, and is when accidents most often occur. The biggest challenge for the athlete is carrying the speed forwards from the inrun with sufficient height over the knoll, and achieving the correct trajectory down the hill. The knoll is the highest point of the hill itself, from which it begins to slope downwards. On modern ski flying hills the table is placed considerably far back from the knoll, so as to reduce the steepness of the flight curve. Skilled athletes are able to aggressively 'snap' into the transition so as to clear the knoll with ease, thereby allowing them to focus completely on using their flying technique to maximise distance further down the hill. All athletes have greatly varying flight curves, each with their own advantages and disadvantages; a flight curve that is too steep or shallow (see angle of attack) is unfavourable. Those of the highest skill level can also consistently compensate for a lack of inrun speed with perfect timing off the table and an excellent transition.

There is a fine line between aggressiveness and over-aggressiveness at takeoff. One of the most common mistakes made by athletes, including those at world class level, is to raise the ski tips too much during the transition. This excessive angle of attack causes the skis to act more as a spoiler than an efficient aerodynamic device to cut through the air, resulting in more height than distance. Conversely, if an athlete over-rotates and leans too far forward between their skis, they will sacrifice height as well as distance. In a well-executed jump, athletes will spend several seconds longer airborne than in ski jumping – up to five seconds more – which requires a different level of skill in order to sustain flight for a longer period, and showcases how the role of aerodynamics is magnified in ski flying. Not all athletes who excel in ski jumping are able do so in ski flying (see #Specialists), and it can be difficult for them to hone their skills in the latter due to the hills being off-limits when competitions are not staged.

Flight phase and equipment

Once the athlete has taken flight, characteristics similar to that of a glider come into force. Ski flyers are able to cover such tremendous distances and land safely primarily due to the skis they use, which are substantially wider and longer than their cross-country or Alpine skiing counterparts. Each ski is first clipped in securely at the front of the boot, which is placed nearer the tail end of the ski and has an exaggerated forward slant. The heel of the boot is then attached to a wedge on the ski using a hinged binding peg and backup strap, allowing the athlete to lean forward into their preferred aerodynamic position and spread the skis wide apart.

Much like aircraft wings, the skis are flexible to an extent, resulting in them bending and vibrating significantly upon takeoff. Maintaining stability in the air is paramount: a loss of balance, or a differential pressure under the skis, can lead to disaster (see list of ski flying accidents). Some athletes have a tendency to yaw over to one side of the hill, a technical defiency (often caused by uneven leg strength) which invariably shortens their jump distance.

Skilful use of headwind and thermal updrafts along various sections of the hill is used to generate additional lift, creating pressure under the oversized skis and enabling athletes to effectively ride on a 'cushion of air'. Mastering the wind conditions is an overwhelmingly important part of ski flying. A reasonable amount of headwind is favourable to a long jump as it has the effect of keeping the athlete aloft and delaying their descent back onto the hill. Conversely, despite providing somewhat of a boost in speed, a tailwind is unfavourable and tends to shorten a jump by pushing the athlete downwards towards the hill prematurely. Even more unfavourable are 'dead' conditions – or no wind at all – which can cause the air pressure to vanish unexpectedly in mid-jump and force the athlete to fall from a dangerous height.

In particular, a tailwind forms one of the most challenging aspects of clearing the knoll and achieving a competitive distance. A crosswind is just as challenging, as it can create dangerous instability in the air. Ideal headwind conditions can allow an athlete to 'catch' an updraft or 'bump' against it at various points of the hill – which always involves some degree of luck – and use it to glide even further, making for an impressive visual effect for audiences.

To further aid athletes in gliding as aerodynamically as possible, they wear a one-piece fabric bodysuit more similar to a wingsuit than a ski suit. This generates yet more lift, but the amount of slack is stringently regulated by the FIS so as to not allow for excessive bagginess and thereby reducing its wingsuit-, sail- or parachute-like properties. In the early 2000s, bodysuits had reached exceptionally baggy proportions, resulting in humorous comparisons to flying squirrels; a ban on these baggy suits came into effect soon after. Today the level of slack for bodysuits is measured by FIS scrutineers at equipment control, led by Christian Kathol, before and after each jump. If the level is exceeded, that athlete is disqualified due to an equipment violation.

Landing phase and distance measurement

The ultimate aim is to land on, or ideally surpass, a line marked across the hill called the K-point, critical point, or calculation line. In order to attain the most points from the style judges, athletes strive for a Telemark landing: instead of landing with simply both feet together (a two-footed landing), one foot is planted clearly in front of the other (without sliding the skis), the other knee bent, both feet held no more than four ski widths' apart, and the body held stable with a straight back and arms outstretched. This pose must be maintained until the outrun – a line at the very end of the hill, where the slope has fully flattened out – is reached. The exact placement of landing is measured between the athlete's front and back feet. Failing to make a Telemark landing results in a loss of style points. Considerably more points are lost if a landing fails before the outrun line, such as falling over or touching the ground with any part of the body except the feet. When the hill begins to flatten out, it becomes increasingly difficult to make a Telemark landing.

Jump distance is measured from the edge of the table to the placement of landing by increments of 0.5 m. This is done using electronic and video monitoring systems together with event personnel assigned to observe jumps by the side of the hill; the latter are known as distance measurers or backup judges, who are present in case the monitoring technology fails. If enough jumps exceed 95% of the hill size – the zone where the slope begins to flatten out – an immediate discussion is held between the jury and race director, which usually results in the start gate being lowered so as to reduce inrun speeds and therefore distances. For spectators and judges, increments of 5 m are clearly indicated by rows of fir across the hill; a painted red line is used for the K-point, and a dashed red line for the hill size. Both sides of the hill are also marked highly visible in red to indicate the landing zone, while the point beyond the hill size is marked in green on the sides. The current leading jump – the distance 'to beat' – is laser-projected as a bright green line across the hill, and is visible to everyone including TV viewers.

Scoring and judging

Distance points
Ski flying uses the same points system as ski jumping, but with two differences. In ski jumping, an athlete who reaches the K-point receives 60 points as a base mark for distance; in ski flying it is 120 points. For every metre beyond the K-point, bonus points are awarded. In ski jumping, a metre has a value of 2 points for normal hills and 1.8 points for large hills; in ski flying, a metre is worth 1.2 points. These bonus points are then added to those received from reaching the K-point. Failing to reach the K-point instead results in a deduction of points from the base mark to the same aforementioned values. Examples:

Style points

Another crucial element of scoring are style points awarded by the judges. Five representatives are selected from different countries, who are situated in an observation tower by the side of the hill. A new set of judges are selected for every competition. They each award points up to 20, in increments of 0.5, based on stylistic merit:
 An athlete's skis should be kept flat, steady and symmetrical during flight, avoiding excessive 'paddling' or an inward cant
 Good balance, an efficient body position and posture should be maintained with minimal arm movement
 The landing should be in a Telemark manner
 If a Telemark landing is not made, 2 style points are deducted
 If a landing is made but fails before the outrun line, a maximum of 5 style points must be deducted

Notably, both the highest and lowest judges' scores are omitted to cancel out any discrepancy, giving a maximum of 60 style points. A perfect jump on a K200 hill would therefore garner a minimum of 180 points (120 distance points + 60 style points) or more, depending on bonus points. However, such a scenario is only an example and not representative of the highly variable nature of the sport. Gaining one or more scores of 20 is very rare, and five is extremely rare. Generally, a good to excellent jump can be expected to receive judges' scores of 18 to 19.5. While a lower score for style puts an athlete at the risk of being less competitive, this may be mitigated or even nullified if they have attained substantial bonus points for distance.

For the 2021–22 World Cup season, judges began using instant replay to review landings after each jump.

Wind and gate compensation
For the 2009–10 Ski Flying World Cup season, beginning in Oberstdorf, and from thereon used at all ski flying and ski jumping events, a supplementary points system was introduced. This system takes into account the wind speed and direction during each jump, as well as mid-round start gate adjustments, in order to enable a more fair contest. If a headwind is present, this is deemed as wind assistance and unfairly advantageous, and points are therefore deducted as compensation; if a tailwind is present, this is deemed to be a disadvantage and additional points are awarded instead. The amount of deduction or addition is calculated via linear coefficient using complex instrumentation which analyses the wind conditions at the time of a jump, and the value of the points themselves are in minimum increments of 0.1.

The second aspect of the compensation system involves the start gate position. If the gate is changed at any point during a round after at least one athlete has jumped, then all subsequent athletes are individually penalised with a points deduction based on how many positions the gate was moved up, or awarded additional points for the gate being lowered. In variable wind conditions requiring either a higher or lower inrun speed than originally anticipated, it is not uncommon for many gate changes to be made as a round wears on. In the era prior to gate compensation, athletes who had jumped before a gate adjustment had to quickly make their way back up the hill to jump again, which was always logistically difficult to arrange due to time constraints. Collectively the system is known as wind/gate compensation, as points gained or lost due to the wind element are set against points gained or lost from gate changes, which is then reflected in an athlete's points score after a jump.

A less commonly used feature of gate compensation is that an athlete's coach may make a tactical decision to request the jury to lower the gate if they believe there is potential ground to be made in terms of points, at the cost of inrun speed; only coaches are permitted to make this request, and only to a lower gate rather than a higher one.

Event details
A ski flying event consists of several preliminary stages, culminating in a competition to decide a winner and subsequent order. Within an event there are up to three competitions – individual, and sometimes team – all taking place on separate days. These competitions are contested somewhat differently depending on whether an event is staged as part of the Ski Flying World Championships or Ski Flying World Cup. In both events, a training round takes place on the opening day, as well as a trial round before each competition; these non-scoring rounds are practice or warm-up sessions, and athlete participation is optional.

Individual competitions

Ski Flying World Championships
In this event there is a qualification round on the opening day, in which up to 70 athletes each jump once to ensure their place for the competition. 40 of these places are available in the first competition, which is narrowed down to 30 for the second competition and remains that way. The starting order of jumps in the qualification round is based on the athletes' current rank within the Ski Jumping World Cup standings in reverse order of points: the leader (who is assigned a distinctive yellow bib) jumps last. The result of qualification determines the order of jumps in the first competition round; the winner of the qualification receives prize money, and is again the last to jump.

The event proper is a tournament composed of two competitions, with two rounds each. In the very first round, all 40 qualified athletes complete a single jump. After points for distance and style are achieved, only the top 30 scorers from the first round proceed to the second, while the rest are eliminated from the event. In round two, the starting order is based on the results of the first round: the lowest scoring athlete jumps first, while the leader has the last jump of that competition. For the second competition, the starting order for round three uses the results from the first competition, with athletes again jumping in ascending order of points. After the fourth and final round, the athlete with the most points accumulated from both competitions is declared the Ski Flying World Champion.

Ski Flying World Cup
Events under the Ski Flying World Cup have several differences to the Ski Flying World Championships. The latter is an isolated, one-off event in the same vein as the Ski Jumping World Championships and Winter Olympics, whereas the Ski Flying World Cup is part of the overall Ski Jumping World Cup season, and uses the same points system. These points contribute towards both Ski Flying and Ski Jumping World Cup standings; the former being effectively a 'mini season' within the latter. A feature shared with the Ski Flying World Championships is that the starting order switches over from the Ski Jumping World Cup standings to the Ski Flying World Cup standings after the first qualification round of the latter, and remains that way for all subsequent events.

Much like in the Ski Jumping World Cup, events are composed of usually one or two individual competitions (rarely three, as was the case in both Vikersund and Planica in 2016), with a qualification round before each one. If there are two competitions, qualification for the second takes place on the same day. The limit of 40 places per competition still applies (unless a cancelled ski jumping competition is rescheduled to a flying hill), but unlike the Ski Flying World Championships, if an athlete fails to qualify for one competition they still have the opportunity to make a fresh start and qualify for the others. Eliminated athletes from qualification can also apply to be test jumpers or V-jumpers (German: Vorspringer) for the opportunity to gain further ski flying experience. If the very last competition of a World Cup season takes place on a ski flying hill, only the top-30 ranked athletes will participate as an 'invitational', with neither an elimination process after the first round, nor a qualification round.

To have a chance of winning a competition, two consistently good jumps must be made. If an athlete finds themselves in an uncompetitive position after the first round, their challenge in the second is to make up ground via the attrition of other athletes, their own distance and style points, and wind/gate compensation. For an athlete who had a poor jump in round one, it is possible for them to climb up the order in round two with an exceptional jump, and if other competitors fall by the wayside. Conversely, a high-scoring athlete may lose their advantage from round one if their second jump is not up to par.

Cancellations

A common situation in ski jumping, and especially ski flying due to the magnified risks overall, arises when unfavourable weather conditions cause a competition to be cut short or cancelled completely; it is also not uncommon for an entire event to be cancelled. Reasons include strong winds, a lack of (or too much) snow, or poor visibility for athletes and judges.

In the case of a shortened competition, the scores from the first round (if completed) are used to determine the final result. This is called a single-round competition and still counts towards both the Ski Flying and Ski Jumping World Cup. For the World Championships, if one of the two competitions is cancelled, the final result will be based on the competition that took place.

Team competitions
As in ski jumping, team competitions are often included at ski flying events. These are contested as part of the World Cup, but points instead count towards a separate Nations Cup for teams; athletes' individual World Cup standings are unaffected. A national team is made up of four athletes selected by their head coach. There can be upwards of eight teams from different countries, providing they are able to field a full team of four.

Just like individual competitions, there are two rounds, but with a difference. Each round is divided into four rotations, in which a member of every team jumps once in the same order. Points are scored the same as they are in individual competitions, but an athlete's points for a jump are instead added to their team's total tally. The starting order of teams in the first round, and first three rotations of the second round, is based on their standings in the Nations Cup. Teams are narrowed down to eight for the second round based on points scored, with the same four athletes jumping in their order of rotation as before.

In the very last rotation, the starting order of teams switches to that of the points tally going in; the athlete on the leading team jumps last. The winning team is the one with the most points at the end of the competition, after which the top three final teams (or more in the event of a tie) participate in a podium ceremony.

Specialists

A number of athletes have been regarded as ski flying specialists for their ability to consistently produce very long jumps and often world records. Those who are currently active with notable ski flying achievements include (as of 2022):
 Stefan Kraft – current world record holder with 253.5 m; nicknamed "Air Kraft" by Eurosport.
 Peter Prevc – 2016 World Champion; former world record holder; first to land a jump of 250 m.

Retired athletes who excelled at ski flying:
 Matti Nykänen – only five-time World Championship medallist (gold in 1985); only male five-time world record holder; described by Al Trautwig as "perhaps the most talented ski flyer around", and by Jeff Hastings as "the best aviator out there today; he knows how to fly." In a survey of contemporary athletes in 2018, Nykänen was voted the greatest ski jumper of all time.
 Matti Hautamäki – four-time world record holder; first to land a jump of 230 m.
 Martin Koch – ski flying expert.
 Johan Remen Evensen – two-time world record holder; first to land a jump of 240 m.
 Bjørn Einar Romøren – two-time world record holder.
 Tommy Ingebrigtsen – two-time world record holder.
 Walter Steiner – 1972 and 1977 World Champion; former world record holder.
 Andreas Goldberger – 1996 World Champion and runner-up in 1992; former world record holder; first to unofficially land a jump of 200 m.
 Sven Hannawald – 2000 and 2002 World Champion, runner-up in 1998.
 Roar Ljøkelsøy – 2004 and 2006 World Champion; described by David Goldstrom as "one of the top ski flyers of his time."
 Mike Holland – last American ski jumper to hold a world record; quoted as saying "Ski flying was my speciality."
 Robert Kranjec – 2012 World Champion; widely acknowledged as a ski flying expert.
 Jurij Tepeš – ski flying expert.
 Noriaki Kasai – 1992 World Champion.

Women in ski flying

Women have also had a limited presence in ski flying. Despite these successes, women have yet to participate in ski flying at World Cup level. The first ever Ski Jumping World Cup season for women was held in 2011–12, but as of yet no ski flying events have been sanctioned. Former World Cup champions Sarah Hendrickson, Sara Takanashi, and Maren Lundby have all expressed a desire to try ski flying.

In 2004, four female athletes – Anette Sagen, Helena Olsson Smeby, Line Jahr, and Lindsey Van – were invited to perform test jumps prior to the men's 2004 Continental Cup event in Vikersund. However, this was initially blocked by Torbjørn Yggeseth, founder of the World Cup and a member of the FIS technical committee at the time, on the grounds that it was too dangerous to allow women on ski flying hills. Sagen challenged this and eventually won the right to jump from the hill, along with her fellow athletes. Both Sagen and Smeby jumped , which remains the third longest distance for women. Van completed two more jumps in Vikersund in 2009, after which ski flying test jumps for women were discontinued.

On 17 April 2021, the FIS held a vote on a proposal to allow women on flying hills in time for the 2022 Raw Air tournament in Vikersund. The proposal was turned down by a vote of 9–7 against. Included amongst the nations who voted against were Austria, Germany and Poland; Norway were strongly in support. Jessica Jerome, Lundby and Hendrickson were disappointed with the decision, whilst Bertil Pålsrud (a member of the FIS equipment committee) said he was confident of Vikersund staging a ski flying event for women in 2023. In the meantime, it was announced that women would compete for the first time on the world's largest ski jumping hill in Willingen during the 2021–22 World Cup season. Due to its size, Willingen has been described as essentially a "small flying hill", which could serve as preparation for potential ski flying events for women.

A year later, on 13 April 2022, the FIS Sub-Committee voted unanimously in favour of women participating in ski flying. Their proposal is to stage a competition in Vikersund for the top 15 female ski jumpers, possibly as part of the 2023 Raw Air tournament. Responding to this news, Lindsey Van said, "It is a huge step forward in the progression of the sport – there have only been seven women to go ski flying in the history of the sport, so it's a big deal. Ski flying is the pinnacle of the sport."

Norway–Slovenia rivalry
Ever since its inception in 1936, ski flying has centred around Slovenia, and more recently Norway. The very first recorded jumps of 100 and 200 m, together with a total of 41 world records, have been set on two different hills in the Alpine valley of Planica: Bloudkova velikanka, which has since been re-established as a ski jumping large hill, and its successor Letalnica bratov Gorišek, dubbed the "monster hill". Since 1997, with very few exceptions, the Ski Jumping World Cup has traditionally held its season finale in Planica. This takes place usually on Letalnica, but is occasionally moved to Bloudkova (most recently in 2014, during renovation at Letalnica).

After being renovated in 2011, Vikersundbakken in the Norwegian town of Vikersund has been the world's pre-eminent ski flying hill, and the rivalry with Planica was renewed after more than twenty years of the latter's dominance of world records. Six world records including the current one have been set in Vikersund, which has also been dubbed the Monsterbakken ("monster hill"). All world records from 1987 onwards have been set exclusively in Planica and Vikersund.

Slovenian athletes were highly successful in Planica between 2012 and 2016, holding a near-lockout on the top spot in individual and team competitions. The four-day event in 2016 drew a total of 110,000 spectators, many of them Slovenians celebrating Peter Prevc's World Cup title victory. Since 2016, Norway has led the way in individual and team competitions, having won four gold medals (three team, one individual) at the Ski Flying World Championships, and dominating 2018 in terms of the World Championships and Ski Flying World Cup.

When distances beyond 200 m were first reached in 1994, Norwegian athletes have been the most preeminent world record setters, with eleven records set by seven athletes as of March 2017. Norwegian and Slovenian athletes in particular have gained a reputation for being experts at ski flying.

Accidents

Due to the extreme speeds and heights involved, coupled with potentially hazardous and unpredictable wind conditions, ski flying has long had a reputation for being highly dangerous. It has been described as an extreme sport and in terms such as "simply insane", "ski jumping on Red Bull", and the "gnarlier, even more dangerous, faceplant-ridden cousin" of ski jumping. Although there have been no recorded fatalities, many serious accidents – known as "falls" or "crashes" – have occurred throughout its history on every hill.

As jumps have increased in distance, sometimes the absolute hill limit – designated as the fall line – is exceeded. This is known as "out-jumping the hill", "landing on the flat", or in the worst case a "flat-ground crash", which occurs when an athlete jumps too far beyond the safety of the slope and lands near, or onto, completely flat ground.

In other media
 From 1970 to 1998, Vinko Bogataj's crash in Oberstdorf was featured prominently on the opening montage of ABC's Wide World of Sports in the United States
 The career of Walter Steiner and his quest for a ski flying world record was documented in the 1974 film, The Great Ecstasy of Woodcarver Steiner, by filmmaker Werner Herzog

Gallery

See also
 FIS Ski Flying World Championships
 FIS Ski Flying World Cup
 List of longest ski jumps

Notes

References

Further reading
 Jahn, Jens; Theiner, Egon (2004). Enzyklopädie des Skispringens (in German). Kassel: Agon Sportverlag. .
 Thoresen, Arne (2007). Lengst gjennom lufta (in Norwegian). Oslo: Versal. .

External links

 FIS official website
 KOP official website  (archived)
 Ski jumping hill archive, featuring detailed information about all ski jumping and flying venues worldwide
 Spectator view of Stefan Kraft and Kamil Stoch's jumps at Planica in 2017 on YouTube

 
Games and sports introduced in 1936
Individual sports
Flying